Sonali Kulkarni  was the president and CEO of FANUC India, the local unit of Japanese industrial robots maker Fanuc Corp. In her role, she oversees all Sales, Marketing, Business Development activities for all products including CNC, Robots, Robomachines and System Integration for Fanuc, India.

Kulkarni has been named one of the most powerful businesswomen in 2014.

Personal life
Ms. Kulkarni is married to Ravi Venkatesan. She is the daughter of Sumitra Gandhi Kulkarni and is the great-grandchild of Mahatma Gandhi and Kasturba Gandhi.

Education
Ms. Kulkarni completed her MBA from Ohio State University and she is a member of Institute of Chartered Accountants of India and American Institute of Certified Public Accountants.	
She has keen interest in environmental sustainability.

Career
Ms. Kulkarni has worked as a Financial Analyst in the US, and took charge as CEO of Fanuc India in 2006.

References

Living people
Businesspeople from Bangalore
Businesswomen from Karnataka
Articles created or expanded during Women's History Month (India) - 2015
21st-century Indian businesspeople
Robotics in India
21st-century Indian businesswomen
1965 births